Kings of the Beach is a beach volleyball computer game released by Electronic Arts in 1988 for the Commodore 64 and MS-DOS. A version for the Nintendo Entertainment System was produced by Konami (under the Ultra Games label) in 1990.

Gameplay

The player can play as Sinjin Smith and Randy Stoklos. The game features three modes of play: practice, match play and tournament.  In the latter, you progress through five beaches (San Diego, Chicago, Waikiki, Rio de Janeiro, and Australia) filled with increasingly challenging opponents as you attempt to win it all.  While Smith and Stoklos are joined by Ron Von Hagen, Tim Hovland and Mike Dodd as the only 'real' volleyball players featured in the game, EA spiced up the competition with some notorious characters from other games, including Hard Hat Mack and Lester from Skate or Die and Ski or Die.

The gameplay controls for the console version are fairly simplistic, with the directional pad and two buttons doing all the work. In the PC version, players control three actions, bump, set, block/spike. Diving for the ball occurs automatically. The only 'advanced' moves in the game are the ability to dink or perform a one-handed Kong block (Stoklos's trademark).

Another endearing feature of the game is the ability to 'argue' calls with the referee, which occasionally allows players to get a point overturned.  However, if players argue too much, the referee may penalize them with a red card and deduct a point.

References

External links
GameFAQs provides a fairly complete overview of the game

1988 video games
Beach volleyball video games
Commodore 64 games
DOS games
Electronic Arts games
Nintendo Entertainment System games
North America-exclusive video games
Sports video games set in the United States
Video games scored by Rob Hubbard
Video games developed in the United States
Tiger Electronics handheld games